Robert Charles Winthrop (May 12, 1809 – November 16, 1894) was an American lawyer and philanthropist, who served as the speaker of the United States House of Representatives. He was a descendant of John Winthrop.

Early life
Robert Charles Winthrop was born in Boston, Massachusetts, to Thomas Lindall Winthrop (1760–1841), the Lieutenant Governor of Massachusetts, and Elizabeth Bowdoin Temple (1769–1825), who were married on July 25, 1786.  He was the youngest of 13 children. 

His maternal grandparents were Sir John Temple, 8th Baronet (1731–1798), the first British envoy to the United States, and Elizabeth Bowdoin, the daughter of James Bowdoin (1726–1790), the Governor of Massachusetts.  His paternal great-great grandfathers were Joseph Dudley (1647–1720) and Wait Still Winthrop (1641/2–1717).

Winthrop attended the prestigious Boston Latin School, and graduated from Harvard University in 1828, which he attended with Dr. Henry Ingersoll Bowditch, George Stillman Hillard, Judge John Gilchrist, Edward Sprague Rand, and others of note.

Career
After studying law with Daniel Webster he was admitted to the bar in 1831 and practiced in Boston.  At 24, he served in the Massachusetts House of Representatives from 1835 to 1840, and served as Speaker of the House of that body from 1838 to 1840.  He was elected a member of the American Antiquarian Society in 1838.

Winthrop was elected US Representative from Massachusetts as a Whig to the 26th United States Congress to fill the vacancy caused by the resignation of Abbott Lawrence; he was reelected to the 27th Congress and served from November 9, 1840, to May 25, 1842, when he resigned due to the death of his wife.

He was subsequently elected to the 27th Congress to fill the vacancy caused by the resignation of his successor, Nathan Appleton; he was reelected to the 28th and to the three succeeding Congresses and served from November 29, 1842 until July 30, 1850. He served as the Speaker of the House during the 30th Congress (1847–1849), but could not secure a second term, losing the 1849 speakership election to Howell Cobb in a protracted 63-ballot contest. He was elected a Fellow of the American Academy of Arts and Sciences in 1849.

After Daniel Webster resigned from the United States Senate to become Secretary of State in 1850, Winthrop resigned from the House and, at 41, was appointed by fellow Whig Governor George Briggs to fill the remainder of Webster's Senate term.  Winthrop's views proved no more palatable to abolitionists than did Webster's, and he failed to win reelection by the state legislature to either of Massachusetts' Senate seats in 1851. He resigned without completing his term immediately following his election loss. Later that year, Winthrop actually won a popular plurality in the race for Massachusetts Governor but as the state Constitution required a majority, the election was thrown into the legislature. The same coalition of Democrats and Free Soilers defeated him again. His final venture into elected political office was as a presidential elector on the Whig ticket in 1852. Afterwards, Winthrop became an independent, unsuccessfully supporting Millard Fillmore, John Bell, and George McClellan.

Later career
With his political career over at the young age of 43, Winthrop spent the remainder of his life in literary, historical, and philanthropic pursuits. He was a major early patron of the Boston Public Library and president of the Massachusetts Historical Society from 1855 to 1885, during which time he wrote a biography of his ancestor John Winthrop.  He served as the president of the Massachusetts Bible Society for several years where he advocated that Christian morality was the necessary condition of a free society. His most notable Christian philosophy for governing men, was as follows:

Men, in a word, must necessarily be controlled either by a power within them or by a power without them; either by the Word of God or by the strong arm of man; either by the Bible or by the bayonet.

His most notable contributions came as permanent Chairman and President of the Peabody Education Fund Trustees, which he served from 1867 to his death. As well as steering the contributions of the Peabody Trust, Winthrop gave his own money to various Southern schools, the most long lasting of which was the $1,500 of seed money provided to a teacher's college that renamed itself Winthrop University in gratitude. He became a noted orator, delivering the eulogy for George Peabody in 1870, and speaking at the ceremony that opened the Washington Monument in 1848.  Winthrop was elected a member of the American Antiquarian Society in October 1894.

In 1892, in a celebration of his birth, it was noted that he had the distinction of having known every President of the United States except Washington and Jefferson.

Personal life

On March 12, 1832, he married Elizabeth Cabot Blanchard (1809–1842), the daughter of Francis Blanchard (1784–1813) and Mary Ann Cabot (1784–1809), and the adopted daughter of Samuel P. Gardner. Elizabeth's elder half-brother was banker John Clarke Lee, founder of Lee, Higginson & Co. Before her death, Robert and Elizabeth had three children:

 Robert Charles Winthrop, Jr. (1834–1905), who married Frances Pickering Adams (1836–1860). After her death, he married Elizabeth Mason (1844–1924), daughter of Robert Means Mason (1810–1879) and Sarah Ellen Francis (1819–1865) and granddaughter of Jeremiah Mason, on June 1, 1869.
 Elizabeth "Eliza" Cabot Winthrop (1838–1921)
 John Winthrop (b. 1841)

After Elizabeth's death, he married his second wife, Laura (née Derby) Welles, widow of Arnold Francis Welles.  Laura was the daughter of attorney John Derby and granddaughter of Elias Hasket Derby, on November 6, 1849.  They remained married until her death in 1861.

On November 15, 1865, he married for the third and final time, to Adele (née Granger) Thayer (1820–1892), the widow of John E. Thayer.  She was the daughter of Francis Granger, the Postmaster General under President William Henry Harrison and Cornelia Rutsen Van Rensselaer.

Winthrop died in Boston in 1894, and is interred in Mount Auburn Cemetery, Cambridge, Massachusetts.  In his will, he left bequests to the Massachusetts Historical Society, the Boston Provident Association, the Boston Children's Hospital, the Library of the Boston Latin School, and the library of the Sunday school of Trinity Church, Boston.

Descendants
His granddaughter, Robert Jr.'s daughter Margaret Tyndal Winthrop (1880–1970), married James Grant Forbes on November 28, 1906.  James and Margaret were the parents of Rosemary Isabel Forbes, who married Richard John Kerry and were the parents of John Forbes Kerry, the U.S. Secretary of State, U.S. Senator and 2004 Presidential candidate. James and Margaret also are the parents of Fiona Diedre Forbes (1924-2010), who married Alain Gauthier Lalonde (1913-1974), the parents of Brice Lalonde, French Minister of the Environment and 1981 French presidential candidate.

See also
 59th Massachusetts General Court (1838)
 60th Massachusetts General Court (1839)
 61st Massachusetts General Court (1840)

References
Notes

Sources

External links

 

 Winthrop's role as Chairman of the PEF
  Robert Winthrop, Addresses and Speeches on Various Occasions, Little, Brown and Company, 1852. 776 pages
 The Ancestors of Senator John Forbes Kerry (b. 1943)
 

|-

|-

|-

|-

|-

1809 births
1894 deaths
Politicians from Boston
American people of English descent
Whig Party members of the United States House of Representatives from Massachusetts
Speakers of the United States House of Representatives
Whig Party United States senators from Massachusetts
1852 United States presidential electors
Members of the Massachusetts House of Representatives
Speakers of the Massachusetts House of Representatives
Philanthropists from Massachusetts
19th-century American philanthropists
Lawyers from Boston
Harvard University alumni
Fellows of the American Academy of Arts and Sciences
Members of the American Antiquarian Society
Burials at Mount Auburn Cemetery
Winthrop family
Boston Latin School alumni